The Seven Revenges (also known as Ivan the Conqueror) is a 1961 Italian adventure film directed by Primo Zeglio. It features American actress Elaine Stewart and was filmed in Yugoslavia.

Plot  
The leaders of Circassians and Kyrgyz face off in a tournament divided into seven challenges: only one will gain the supremacy.

Cast 

 Ed Fury: Ivan 
 Elaine Stewart: Tamara 
 Bella Cortez: Suani 
 Roldano Lupi: Great Khan 
 Paola Barbara: Deniza 
 Furio Meniconi: Amok 
 Gabriele Antonini: Kir 
 Sergio Ukmar: Yakub 
 Franco Ukmar: Ostop

References

External links

1961 films
1961 adventure films
Italian adventure films
Films directed by Primo Zeglio
Films with screenplays by Sergio Leone
1960s Italian films